You Are the Music...We're Just the Band is the third studio album by British rock band Trapeze. Recorded with producer Neil Slaven, it was released in 16 March 1972 by Threshold Records. The album was preceded by the release of the single "Coast to Coast" in 1972.

Background
You Are the Music...We're Just the Band was the last Trapeze album recorded by the lineup of Glenn Hughes, Mel Galley and Dave Holland, as Hughes left the band in 1973 to join Deep Purple. The album was also the band's first not to be produced by John Lodge, and featured a wide range of guest performers, including guitarist B. J. Cole, pianist Rod Argent and saxophonist Jimmy Hastings. Five of the album's eight songs were written by Hughes, while the other three were written by Galley and his brother Tom.

Reception

Critical reception for You Are the Music...We're Just the Band was generally positive. Variety called the album "another hard-rockin' set by Trapeze".

Legacy
A retrospective review for AllMusic, Richard Foss praises Hughes's vocal performances and the "softer tunes" of the album. Foss named "Coast to Coast" and "What Is a Woman's Role" as particular highlights.

Track listing

Personnel

Primary personnel
Glenn Hughes – bass, piano, vocals
Mel Galley – guitar
Dave Holland – drums, percussion
Technical
Neil Slaven – production
John Burns – engineering
Dave Grinsted – engineering
Carl Dunn – photography
Fin Costello – photography
Garry Sharpe-Young – liner notes

Guest musicians
B. J. Cole – steel guitar on "Keepin' Time" and "Coast to Coast"
Rod Argent – electric piano on "Coast to Coast", piano on "Feelin' So Much Better Now"
Kirk Duncan – electric piano on "What Is a Woman's Role"
John Ogden – percussion on "What Is a Woman's Role"
Frank Ricotti – vibraphone on "Will Our Love End"
Jimmy Hastings – alto saxophone on "Will Our Love End"

References

1972 albums
Funk rock albums
Trapeze (band) albums
Threshold Records albums